WSLI may refer to:

 WSLI (AM), a radio station (1480 AM) licensed to serve Kentwood, Michigan, United States
 WSLI-FM, a radio station (90.9 FM) licensed to serve Belding, Michigan